Abracadabra is a 2019 Indonesian black comedy fantasy film, directed and written by Faozan Rizal. The film stars Reza Rahadian as Lukman, a magician who tries to bring back a little boy who vanishes from his magic box.

The film had its world premiere at the 2019 Jogja-NETPAC Asian Film Festival. It was theatrically released on 9 January 2020.

Premise
Lukman, a magician, tries to make a little boy vanishing from his magic box as his swan song. Unexpectedly, he cannot make the boy come back to the stage. Abracadabra follows Lukman's journey to bring back the vanishing boy.

Cast

Production
Director Faozan Rizal conceived the idea of Abracadabra in 2017. To Rizal, magic world and cinema served as worlds where "he could live in his own imagination".

The filming took place in Yogyakarta.

Release
Abracadabra had its world premiere as the opening film of 2019 Jogja-NETPAC Asian Film Festival. It was theatrically released on 9 January 2020. During its run at the theatres, the film garnered 12,523 moviegoers and grossed Rp 500 million ($35,038).

Accolades

References

2019 films
Films about magic and magicians
2019 black comedy films
2019 fantasy films
Indonesian comedy films